Jainamedu is a suburb or neighbourhood of Palakkad city, Kerala, India. It is located on the southern banks of the Kalapathy River, it is one of the western suburbs of Palakkad and is ward 51 of Palakkad Municipality.

It is best known its 15-century Jain temple.Jainamedu is one of the few places in Kerala where the vestiges of Jainism have survived. Once, there were around 400 Jain families in Palakkad, but now only a few of them exist.

References

Palakkad
Suburbs of Palakkad
Cities and towns in Palakkad district